Miriam Schlein (June 6, 1926 – November 23, 2004) was an American author who wrote nearly 100 books (in 5 decades) that helped teach children about animals and more obscure ideas such as space and time. Her books include Discovering Dinosaur Babies (1991), The Dino Quiz Book (1995),  and Before the Dinosaurs (1996).

Schlein died of vasculitis in Manhattan, New York, at age 78, in 2004. The Beinecke Rare Book and Manuscript Library of Yale University contains a collection of her writings, research material, correspondence, clippings, photographs, and slides.

Partial works
When Will the World Be Mine?  (1953)
The Bumblebee's Secret (1958)
Amuny, Boy of Old Egypt (1961) - Abelard-Schuman
Who? (1963) - Henry Z. Walck, Inc.
The Way Mothers Are (1963)
The Snake in the Carpool (1963)
What's Wrong With Being a Skunk? (1974)
I, Tut: The Boy Who Became Pharaoh (1979)
Lucky Porcupine (1980)
The Year of the Panda (1990)
Discovering Dinosaur Babies (1991)
I Sailed with Columbus (1991)
The Dino Quiz Book (1995)
The Puzzle of the Dinosaur-Bird: The Story of Archaeopteryx (1996)
What the Dinosaurs Saw (1998)
Hello, Hello! (2002)
Little Raccoon's Big Question (2004)

References

External links
 Miriam Schlein's obituary @ The New York Times
 Miriam Schlein Papers. General Collection, Beinecke Rare Book and Manuscript Library, Yale University.

1926 births
2004 deaths
American children's writers
Deaths from vasculitis
Writers from New York City
20th-century American women writers
21st-century American women